An admission to practice law is acquired when a lawyer receives a license to practice law. In jurisdictions with two types of lawyer, as with barristers and solicitors, barristers must gain admission to the bar whereas for solicitors there are distinct practising certificates.

Becoming a lawyer is a widely varied process around the world. Common to all jurisdictions are requirements of age and competence; some jurisdictions also require documentation of citizenship or immigration status. However, the most varied requirements are those surrounding the preparation for the license, whether it includes obtaining a law degree, passing an exam, or serving in an apprenticeship. In English, admission is also called a law license. Basic requirements vary from country to country, as described below.

In some jurisdictions, after admission the lawyer needs to maintain a current practising certificate to be permitted to offer services to the public.

Africa
The African Union comprises all 55 countries on the Continent of Africa. However, the qualifications for each nation can vary widely between them, with foreign educated lawyers having the most difficulty in obtaining residency.

Algeria
Those wishing to obtain a law degree must have Algerian nationality, be at least 23 years old, possess at least a bachelor's degree in law or equivalent degree in Islamic law, have a certificate of competency for the legal profession, and enjoy full political and civil rights without any convictions for a crime of dishonesty.

Angola
Angolan nationals and foreigners who wish to practice law must complete a law degree from an Angolan university and then take the National Exam for Admission to Advocacy. The regulations that establish that citizens admitted to the study of individuals accept foreign countries, on an equal basis, Angolan graduates. The Order of Attorneys of Angola is an organization of lawyers and responsible for the regulation of the legal profession in the country.

Botswana
Botswana requires a Bachelor of Laws degree to practice law. The Bachelor of Laws degree is earned through a five-year undergraduate program, with the fifth year as an internship. After completing a Bachelor of Laws program, applicants may practice law. A bar exam is not required.

Egypt
To earn a law license, applicants must have Egyptian nationality, full civil capacity, not have any disciplinary findings against them, and be of good conduct and reputation. They are required to earn a law degree from an Egyptian university or a degree from a foreign university which is considered equivalent under Egyptian law, pass a medical examination to ensure fitness for the practice of the profession, and pay the registration fees and annual subscriptions required by law. After an applicant obtains a law degree, he or she must then undertake two years of practical training as a trainee lawyer and plead a minimum of 25 cases. Following the completion of the training period, the applicant must obtain the recommendation of the president of the lowest court and members of the local bar association to be admitted as a lawyer.

Ethiopia
A law license requires a diploma in law from a legally recognized educational institution. Ethiopian law schools offer undergraduate (LLB) and postgraduate (Juris Doctor) degrees in law. Students must complete a college preparatory program before acceptance to an LLB program. Those with an undergraduate degree (BA or BSC) in another field may be admitted to a three-year Juris Doctor program. All undergraduate students must complete the Law School Exit Examination to graduate. After earning a law degree, graduates must pass an exam for the relevant law license. The Regions of Ethiopia and the Ethiopian federal government all issue their own licenses for the practice of law.

Gabon
Gabon requires candidates to hold a law degree and complete a one-year internship under the supervision of a lawyer who has been licensed to practice law for at least five years. After completing the internship, the candidate must then petition the President of the Bar Association for a second one-year internship. At the end of the second internship, the candidate may petition the Bar Council to be enrolled as a lawyer.

Ghana
The General Legal Council is responsible for issuing licenses to practice law. Applicants must be of good character and have satisfactorily completed a course in law which meets its requirements at a school of law or other place of instruction it recognizes, or be qualified in practicing law in a country with a sufficiently analogous legal system. They must also practice for at least six months in the chambers of a lawyer who has been working in the profession for not less than seven years. Law licenses must be renewed annually. Those admitted to practice law in Ghana become members of the Ghana Bar Association.

Kenya

Governance
Legal practice in Kenya is governed by the Advocates Act, Chapter 16 of the Laws of Kenya. Only lawyers admitted to the Bar, known as Advocates of the High Court of Kenya, have the right of audience before Kenyan courts. To be an advocate, (which is concurrent with being a member of the Law Society of Kenya) one must first complete a law degree from a recognised university in Kenya or any other Commonwealth country, then attend the Kenya School of Law for a postgraduate Diploma in Legal Practice for training in more practical legal subjects such as conveyancing and evidence, and complete a mandatory six-month articles of pupillage under a lawyer of five years' standing.

Petition
Upon completion of the requisite academic and practical training, one must 'petition' the chief justice of the judiciary for admission to the bar by filing the requisite documents, including the petition in a prescribed format under the Advocates Act and an accompanying affidavit, a certificate of completion of pupillage and two certificates of moral fitness by practising lawyers of five years' standing, one of which must be from the petitioner's supervisor in chambers (referred to as 'pupil master'), and pay a fee.

The petition is addressed to both the registrar of the High Court on behalf of the chief justice and the secretary/CEO of the Law Society of Kenya, and upon approval by the Council of the Law Society, one is 'called to the bar'. The call is made in open court by taking an oath before the chief justice, who pronounces the admission. Usually, several lawyers are admitted to the bar at the same session.

Practice renewal
An annual fee for a 'practising certificate' must be paid to the Law Society of Kenya, although the certificate is issued by the Court Registrar. Non-payment renders one ineligible to appear before courts. Lawyers who do not wish to appear before courts need not take out a certificate, but in practice most lawyers do so as it is generally required by most employers, since only advocates can sign any documents in such capacity.

Advocates who wish to administer oaths—usually in affidavit format—must apply to the Chief Justice to be appointed Commissioners for Oaths, whereas those who wish to perform functions similar to notaries public in the United Kingdom must have been advocates for five years, and formally apply to be a notary public to the Chief Justice through the Court Registrar. To appear before the Supreme Court, one must be an advocate of seven years' standing.

Madagascar
To become an advocate (advocat), an individual must obtain a master's degree in law or equivalent degree and a Certificate of Aptitude for the Legal Profession, after which three years of further legal training, which can be extended by another two years, are required. Lawyers must re-register annually.

Morocco
To be registered as an advocate, an individual must be a Moroccan national or national of a country which has an agreement with Morocco which grants nationals of both countries reciprocal rights to practice law, be at least 21 years of age, enjoy full civil capacity, possess a bachelor's degree in law from a Moroccan law school or equivalent certificate from a recognized university, obtain a certificate of eligibility to practice law, have no convictions, never have been declared bankrupt, and not have been linked to the management of public institutions for a certain amount of time. Applicants must then pass the bar exam conducted by the Ministry of Justice and practice as a trainee lawyer for two years.

Namibia
Namibia has a detailed act that fully delineates the requisites to be a Legal Practitioner. Aspiring lawyers must hold a law degree from the University of Namibia or equivalent qualification from a university outside the country recognized by the Namibian government, obtain a certificate from the Board of Legal Education stating that the trainee lawyer has undergone practical legal training, and pass the Legal Practitioners' Qualifying Examination.

Niger
Admission to the Niger Bar requires a master's degree in law, passing the entry exam, completing a Certificate of Professional Practice and a one-year internship, or a two-year internship for those who do not have a Certificate of Professional Practice. At the end of the internship, the trainee lawyer is given a certificate of completion after their supervisor gives a reasoned opinion, and is eligible to register for the Niger Bar.

Nigeria
One has to complete a five-year LLB program in an accredited university in Nigeria or abroad, then a compulsory one-year program (bar 2) at the Nigerian Law School. International students do a preliminary course (bar 1) before doing the compulsory one-year program. During the law school program, students do compulsory court attachment and chamber attachment before graduation. After obtaining a law degree, aspiring lawyers must pass the examination at the Nigerian Law School. Those who pass are then called to the Nigerian Bar by the Nigerian Body of Benchers and enroll as a legal practitioner before the Supreme Court of Nigeria.

Rwanda
Holders of a Rwandan law license must be nationals of Rwanda, hold at least a bachelor's degree in law or equivalent degree, have a certificate from the Institute of Legal Practice and Development or an equivalent, and pass the bar exam. Applicants must also not have been sentenced to a prison term equal to or exceeding six months.

Sudan
Individuals who apply to become advocates in Sudan must possess Sudanese nationality, be at least 21 years of age and of good character, possess an LLB degree from a recognized educational institution, and pass the Legal Professing exam, which is managed by the Advocates Admissions Committee, unless granted an exemption from doing so. Successful applicants must complete a one-year traineeship, then pass an interview with the Bar Admission Committee before being admitted. Licenses must be renewed annually.

Tunisia
To practice as an advocate in Tunisia, individuals must be registered in the table of advocats. Registration requires a person to have held Tunisian nationality for at least five years, to be a resident of Tunisia, be between 20 and 50 years of age, have no criminal record, never to have been declared bankrupt, and have fulfilled all national service requirements. Candidates must hold a certificate of aptitude for the legal profession from the Higher Institute of the Legal Profession unless they hold the title of Professor of Law from a Tunisian or foreign university, in which case they may gain an exemption from this requirement. Newly qualified lawyers must spend a year as a trainee lawyer, during which time they can only plead before lower courts. After one year, they may apply to be fully certified as a lawyer.

Uganda
To be admitted as an advocate, an individual must be a Ugandan national or resident, possess a Bachelor of Laws degree from a Ugandan university or an educational institution from any other country with a common law legal system and recognized by the Law Council, and obtain a postgraduate diploma in legal practice from the Law Development Centre. Candidates must then apply to be recognized as lawyers by the Law Council, which will issue an advocate's license if satisfied that the applicant is eligible and is a fit and proper person to be an advocate. Advocate's licenses must be renewed annually.

Zimbabwe
To be admitted to practice law, one must complete an LLB degree from the University of Zimbabwe or Midlands State University, register with the Law Society of Zimbabwe and receive a practicing certificate, and be enrolled on the register of the Supreme Court of Zimbabwe. Practicing certificates from the Law Society of Zimbabwe must be renewed annually. Holders of degrees from outside Zimbabwe must have obtained them from designated institutions and take an exam.

Americas
In U.S. English, admission to the bar is also commonly known as obtaining one's "law license" ("licence" in Canadian English).

Anguilla 
Admission to practice in Anguilla is regulated by the Legal Profession Act 2016. To be admitted in Anguilla a person first needs to be admitted in either England & Wales, Scotland or Northern Ireland, or have received a Certificate of Legal Education from the Council of Legal Education of the West Indies. Further the applicant needs to be either (a) a Belonger of Anguilla, (b) resident in Anguilla, or (c) a citizen of certain specified Caribbean countries.

Argentina 
In Argentina, prospective lawyers must complete an undergraduate law degree (Abogado, which lasts five to six years depending on the university), and then become a member of one of the jurisdictional associations.

Bahamas 
Under the laws of the Bahamas, only a Bahamian national can normally be admitted as a lawyer. However, there is an exception for special admissions to allow senior barristers who have specialist expertise to be admitted to conduct a single case.

Bolivia 
Bolivia requires candidates to complete a law degree at a Bolivian law faculty, which takes 9-10 semesters, and then submit a graduate certificate and certificate of good civil standing to the Ministry of Justice.

Brazil 
Brazil requires an undergraduate law degree (Bachelor in law, in Portuguese Bacharelado em Direito, which lasts five years) and the passing of the bar examination.

British Virgin Islands 
A person may be admitted as a barrister or solicitor in the British Virgin Islands either by being admitted as a lawyer in the United Kingdom, or by attending one of the three regional law schools (Hugh Wooding Law School, Norman Manley Law School or Eugene Dupuch Law School). In 2015 the British Virgin Islands passed the Legal Profession Act 2015. Although the new admission rules under the Act have not yet been brought into force, once it does so graduates from regional law schools will still be eligible for admission but will have to undertake a period of one years' pupillage; and lawyers from the United Kingdom will only be eligible for admission if they have five years' post-qualification experience. The new regime will also allow senior foreign lawyers to be admitted temporarily just for a single case.

Canada 
Canadian applicants to the bar must obtain admission (referred to as the "call to the bar") to one of the provincial or territorial Law Societies in the various jurisdictions of Canada. All domestically trained lawyers must have a bachelor's degree in law LLB or Juris Doctor (JD) from a law school accredited by the provincial law society or the National Committee on Accreditation before being called to the bar. Admission requirements to law school vary between those of common law jurisdictions, which comprise all but one of Canada's provinces and territories, and the province of Quebec, which is a civil law jurisdiction. For common law schools, students must have already completed an undergraduate degree before being admitted to an LLB or JD programme, although this requirement can be waived in exceptional circumstances. For civil law schools, students must generally either have graduated from a general and vocational college (CEGEP), have a two-year college degree, or have completed at least a year of undergraduate education. Once students earn a law degree, they must typically pass examinations and serve in an apprenticeship as an articled clerk with a law firm for a certain amount of time.

The exact requirements vary among the different provinces and territories. For example, the Law Society of British Columbia requires that a student complete an undergraduate degree in any discipline and before studying for an undergraduate law degree (LL.B. and/or B.C.L., three to four years) or Juris Doctor (three years). The applicant must then pass two licensing examinations, the Barrister Licensing Examination and Solicitor Licensing Examination, then article with a law firm for nine to fifteen months depending on the jurisdiction and nature of the articling process. The Law Society of Ontario likewise requires law graduates to pass a Barrister Licensing Examination and Solicitor Licensing Examination, then requires that candidates complete ten months of articles supervised by a practising lawyer, or an alternative such as an eight-month Law Practise Program. Other provinces have similar but not identical examination and training requirements. All provinces also have character and fitness requirements.

Cayman Islands 
A person may be admitted as an attorney-at-law in the Cayman Islands by one of three routes. A newly qualified person may qualify by either holding a bachelor of laws degree from the Cayman Islands Law School or an equivalent institution or a non-law degree together with the Common Professional Examination/Graduate Diploma in Law, and then completing the 9-month Professional Practise Course ("PPC"), followed by eighteen months as an articled clerk within a law firm. Under the Legal Practitioners (Students) Regulations (2012 Revision) only Caymanians or persons that hold Cayman Status or as otherwise approved by the Cayman Islands Cabinet may undertake the PPC. Lawyers who are already qualified to practice in the United Kingdom, Jamaica or another approved Commonwealth jurisdiction may be admitted under the Legal Practitioners Law (2015 Revision) provided that they are in good standing in their jurisdiction of admission and can demonstrate residence in the Cayman Islands for at least a year (usually by holding a valid work permit for that period of time). Lastly, lawyers who are admitted in another jurisdiction and who only wish to be temporarily admitted in the Cayman Islands for the purposes of appearing in a single case (usually King’s Counsel from London) may be temporarily admitted. All attorneys are required to hold a current practicing certificate to practice law, but the Cayman Islands is slightly unusual that if an Attorney ceases to hold a practicing certificate for two years they are struck off the roll.

Chile 
Chile requires a law degree (Licenciado en Ciencias Jurídicas: five years, and to approve a degree exam comprising all studied civil and procedural law that usually can takes one or two years more). A six-month  apprenticeship is also required. Candidates then take their oath as a lawyer in the Supreme Court.

Cuba 
In Cuba, candidates must complete a law degree. Law school courses last five years and include several cycles of apprenticeships. After graduating, most students must sit the bar exam. Those with the highest grades may be admitted to practice law by writing an honors thesis rather than taking the bar exam. All graduates must also perform three years of social service.

Ecuador 
Ecuador requires a law degree from a university in Ecuador recognized by the Secretary of Higher Education, Science, Technology and Innovation. Candidates must then complete a Pre-Professional Practice Program in a given public institution, totalling at least 500 hours of study. They must then register with the Lawyers' Forum of the Judicial Council.

Guatemala 
To be admitted as a lawyer in Guatemala, it is necessary to hold a certificate of competence issued by the Supreme Court of Justice, which is available to those who are Guatemalan nationals and have obtained a law degree from a recognized university. Those practicing law must also register with the College of Attorneys and Notaries.

Mexico 
Lawyers in Mexico are required to complete a law degree (Licenciado en Derecho, a five-year program), and obtain a practice certificate (cedula professional) from the Bureau of Professions of the Ministry of Education (Dirección General de Profesiones), which officially certifies the license by virtue of the law degree.

Peru 
Lawyers (Abogados) in Peru must be members of a local bar association, which requires an undergraduate law degree (Bachiller en Derecho, a six-year program) and a diploma (Titulo de Abogado), the latter requiring one year of apprenticeship and passing of the bar exam.

United States 

In the United States, all states, territories, and the District of Columbia regulate and license the legal profession separately and maintain their own bar associations. While some other Common law countries maintain separate categories of lawyers in the form of barristers and solicitors, there is only one category of lawyer in the United States. The terms lawyer and attorney are used interchangeably. With varying exceptions, jurisdictions typically require that candidates complete a postgraduate law degree and pass the bar examination.

Most jurisdictions require applicants to complete a Juris Doctor degree from a law school approved by the American Bar Association (ABA). In the United States, all law degrees are postgraduate. Law schools require candidates to hold a bachelor's degree prior to commencing law studies. There are no requirements for any particular undergraduate degrees, and aspiring law students may complete a degree in any particular subject or in general studies. Formal pre-law programs exist but are not typically given special favor by law schools. A minority of states permit graduates of law schools not approved by the ABA to take their bar examination or will admit a graduate of such a school to their bar association provided that the candidate has been admitted to the bar of another state. The states of Alabama, California, Connecticut, Massachusetts, West Virginia, and Tennessee allow individuals to take the bar exam upon graduation from law schools approved by state bodies but not accredited by the ABA. Specifically in California, certain law schools "registered" with the Committee of Bar Examiners of the State Bar of California (CBE) are authorized to grant Juris Doctor degrees although they are not accredited by the ABA or CBE. Students at these schools must take and pass the First-Year Law Students' Examination (commonly referred to as the "Baby Bar") administered by the CBE, and may continue their studies to obtain their Juris Doctor degree upon passage of this exam.

The state of New York makes special provision for persons educated to degree-level in common law from overseas, with holders of bachelor degrees in law being qualified to take the bar exam and, upon passing, be admitted to the bar. 

All jurisdictions require applicants to pass a moral character evaluation and to pass an ethics examination, which some states administer as part of their bar examinations. Most also require applicants to achieve a particular score on the Multistate Professional Responsibility Examination.

The states of Wisconsin and New Hampshire are the only jurisdictions to not unconditionally require law graduates to pass a bar exam for admission. Diploma privilege is available in those states for graduates of certain law schools whose degree programmes meet certain requirements. Most states and territories also allow admission on motion, in which licensed attorneys from different jurisdictions who have practiced for a certain period of time (typically three to seven years) may be admitted to practice law without taking a bar exam through a motion or application with the state supreme court, board of bar examiners, or bar association, typically accompanied by certificates of good standing from all other jurisdictions where they are admitted to practice and a background check demonstrating good moral character.

The states of California, Maine, New York, Vermont, Virginia, Washington, and West Virginia allow applicants to study under a judge or practicing attorney for an extended period of time rather than attending law school. This method is known as "reading law" or "reading the law". New York allows applicants who read law to take the bar exam, but only if they have at least one year of law school study. Maine allows students who completed two years of law school to serve an apprenticeship in lieu of completing their third year. New Hampshire's only law school has an alternative licensing program that allows students who have completed certain curricula and a separate exam to bypass the regular bar examination. California allows students who completed two years of college coursework, or the equivalent as demonstrated by examination, to meet the legal education requirement for the bar exam by studying law diligently in a lawyer's office or judge's chambers for not less than 864 hours over not less than four years. Hours spent as an employee of an attorney or judge are not counted as study. Very few people pursue these options.

The American legal system is unusual in that it has no formal apprenticeship or clinical training requirements prior to admission to the bar, with a few exceptions. Delaware requires that candidates for admission to the bar serve five months in a clerkship with a lawyer in the state. Vermont had a similar requirement but eliminated it in 2016. Washington requires, since 2005, that applicants must complete a minimum of four hours of approved pre-admission education. Some law schools have tried to rectify this lack of experience by requiring supervised "Public Service Requirements" of all graduates. States that encourage law students to undergo clinical training or perform public service in the form of pro bono representation may allow students to appear and practice in limited court settings under the supervision of an admitted attorney.

Asia

Bangladesh
Practicing law requires admission to the Bangladesh Bar Council. In order to do so, candidates must be citizens of Bangladesh, be a minimum of 21 years old, and obtain a law degree. They must pass the Bar Council Examination to be allowed to practice law.

Bhutan
Bhutan requires a bachelor's degree in law followed by a bar exam. Candidates must also not have criminal records and not be declared bankrupt by a court.

Cambodia
Cambodia requires a Bachelor of Law or equivalent law degree, certificate of Lawyer's Professional Skill from the Center for the Training of the Legal Profession, and no misdemeanor or felony record, as well as no disciplinary sanction or administrative penalty. Unless granted an exemption, prospective lawyers must then spend a year as a trainee lawyer, either in a training program conducted by the Bar Association or by working as an associate in a law firm. Following the training period, the Bar Council will make a decision whether or not to register the prospective lawyer with the Bar Association based on whether or not the trainee fulfilled the requirements and a report on the trainee's supervising lawyer. If the Bar Council decides that the trainee does not have sufficient competence, it can order a period of additional training not to exceed one year. Applicants who satisfy the Bar Council that they are of sufficient competence are registered with the Bar Association and are allowed to practice law.

China
In China, one must first obtain a recognized law degree (a bachelor's, master's, or doctoral degree) or have at least three years of work experience in certain legal institutions. Those aspiring to be allowed to practice law must also have a record of good behavior. Applicants must then pass the National Unified Legal Professional Qualification Examination. They must also complete a one-year apprenticeship before being granted a license to practice law.

Hong Kong
The special administrative region of Hong Kong makes a distinction between barristers and solicitors. Admission to either profession requires a law degree (either the four-year LL.B. or the two-year Juris Doctor) and a Postgraduate Certificate in Laws (which requires nine months). The apprenticeship to become a barrister is only one year, while a solicitor must apprentice for two years.

Foreign lawyers (from any jurisdiction) may be admitted as solicitors by passing the Overseas Qualified Lawyers Examination and satisfying a three months residence requirement. Foreign lawyers may also be admitted as barristers by passing the Barristers Qualification Examination.

India
In India, prospective lawyers  must complete an undergraduate law degree after 12 years of schooling and obtain an honours law degree, (actually a double degree) where the course is a five-year course. The first undergraduate foundational and generic degree, (usually B.A.Law but in some cases Bachelor of General Laws/Bachelor of Socio-Legal Studies etc.) is awarded after three years of study, and the professional law degree called the LL.B. (honours) degree, which has a substantial component of practical training, is earned after two years of further legal studies.

Alternatively any graduate with a bachelor's degree in any subject (obtained after 15 years of education, i.e. after graduation), can enroll for a second graduate degree in law of a three-year course (LL.B. degree). The 5-year LL.B. (honours) degree and the 3-year LL.B. degree are the only qualifying professional degrees recognized for entering the legal profession in India.

Law graduates in India are not entitled to call themselves advocates and can not appear in courts even if they call themselves lawyers.
India requires all law graduates, intending to enter the profession of practising law as advocates, to first enroll themselves on the Roll of Advocates of any State Bar Council (regional authorities under the overall authority of the Bar Council of India) and to pass the All India Bar Examination (AIBE) conducted by the Bar Council of India which is the institution regulating the profession of legal practice. It is mandatory for all law school graduates to qualify in the All India Bar Examination, without which they cannot be admitted to practice in courts and may not refer to themselves as advocates. After being enrolled by one of the State Bar Councils and clearing the All India Bar Examination, a law graduate's name is entered on the Roll of Advocates maintained by their State Bar Council and is issued a Certificate of Practice. After this, they are entitled to call themselves advocates and can appear in court representing clients.

All advocates in India, irrespective of which State Bar Council they are registered to, have the right to practice in all High Courts and their Subordinate Courts and Tribunals throughout India under Section 30 of the Advocates Act. However, to practise Law before the Supreme Court of India, Advocates must first appear for and qualify in the Supreme Court Advocate on Record Examination conducted by the Supreme Court.

Indonesia
There is no distinction between barrister and solicitor in Indonesia. Instead, an admitted person to the bar to practice law is called an advocate (advokat), who is licensed to provide legal services both before or outside the court.

To be an Indonesian advocate, one needs to be appointed by Peradi (Indonesian Advocates Association) and take an oath in an open proceeding before the high court having a jurisdiction over the prospective advocate. As an advocate, one is allowed to practice law all over Indonesia.

Before appointed as an advocate, there are requirements which must be met which are listed under Article 3 paragraph 1 of the Indonesian Law No. 18 of 2003 on Advocate. The prospective advocate should be an Indonesian citizen, domiciled in Indonesia, is not a civil servant nor a state official, at least 25 years old, holds a bachelor's degree in law and has completed the special education for advocates arranged by Peradi, passed the bar exam organised by Peradi, has completed an internship in a law office for a continuous period of 2 years, has never been penalised for a criminal offense which is subject to an imprisonment of 5 years or more, and well behaved, honest, could act fairly and has a high integrity.

Iran
Iran requires an undergraduate law degree (LL.B., which is a four-year program). After obtaining a law degree, the candidate must pass the bar exam. The Bar Exam in Iran is administered by two different and completely separate bodies. One is the Bar Association of every province—all of which are under the auspices of the country's syndicate of the bars of the country. The other one is administered by the Judicial System of Iran subject to Article 187 of the country's economic, social and cultural development plan. The exam is highly competitive and only a certain number of top applicants are admitted annually.

After a candidate completes a law degree and passes the bar exam, they are admitted to the bar as a "Trainee at Law". After admission to the bar, an 18-month apprenticeship begins which is highly regulated under the auspices of Bar Syndicate Rules and supervision of an assigned First Degree Attorney. Trainees or apprentices must attend designated courts for designated weeks to hear cases and write case summaries. A logbook signed by the judge on the bench has to certify their weekly attendance. By the end of the eighteenth month, they are eligible to apply to take the Final Bar Exam by submitting their case summaries, the logbook and a research work pre-approved by the Bar. It is noteworthy, however, that during these 18 months, Trainees are eligible to have a limited practice of law under the supervision of their supervising Attorney. This practice does not include Supreme Court eligible cases and certain criminal and civil cases. Candidates will be tested on Civil law, Civil Procedure, Criminal law, Criminal Procedure, Commercial Law, Notary (including rules pertaining Official Documents, Land & Real Estate registrations and regulations etc.). Each exam takes two days, a day on oral examination in front of a judge or an attorney, and a day of essay examination, in which they will be tested on hypothetical cases submitted to them. Successful applicants will be honored with the title of "First Degree Attorney", after they take the oath and can practice in all courts of the country including the Supreme Court. Those who fail must redo the program in full or in part before re-taking the Final Bar Exam.

Israel
Israel requires an undergraduate law degree from an educational institution recognized by the Law Faculty of the Hebrew University of Jerusalem. Applicants must then pass a series of examinations on eight separate areas of law. After these exams, the applicant must complete an apprenticeship in a law firm as an articled clerk for twelve months, at least 36 hours a week. After serving their articles, applicants must pass the final examinations on nine subjects of law and court procedure, which consist of a written examination followed by an oral examination before three judges. Those who pass are eligible for admittance to the Israel Bar Association. Residence in Israel is a precondition for admittance.

Lawyers moving to Israel from abroad without an Israeli law degree must have at least two years of practical legal experience as an attorney or judge in their country of origin. If an applicant does not have the required experience, the foreign law degree must be recognized by the Hebrew University of Jerusalem. The applicant must also complete a Hebrew proficiency exam followed by the battery of exams and internship requirements listed above. Those who have at least five years of practical legal experience abroad and began serving their articles within ten years of their arrival in Israel are exempt from the final examinations.

Japan

Japan requires the passing of the national bar exam, a 12-month training program which incorporates additional coursework and field training as apprentices to judges, prosecutors, and law offices, and passing the graduation examination of the training program. To sit for the bar exam, applicants must have the degree of juris doctor or have passed the preliminary bar exam. The training program is conducted by the Legal Research and Training Institute of the Supreme Court of Japan. During the program, future prosecutors and judges are handpicked and trained for the role.

In Japan, an attorney must be a member of one of the local bar associations which are organised into national bar association.

Jordan
The Jordanian Bar Association requires both academic, practical and oral exams for admission to the bar. The probationer must hold a bachelor's degree or equivalent in Law.

The Bar Association requires a minimum of two years of training under supervision of an Attorney. However, if a post-graduate degree in law is attained, a reduction to one year of training is possible. The Bar grants the probationer, at different stages of his training, special rights of audience to appear before specific courts.

The probationer may submit a written request, at any stage of his training, to be enrolled in the written exams that the Bar holds 4 times a year. If he/she attains an exam mark of (15/25) or higher, then the probationer will progress to the oral exam conducted by a legal committee elected from a combination of judges, professors and senior lawyers. If he/she passes the oral exam, then they are required to submit a research paper. Each probationer must research a legal subject, submit a written paper, and discuss his/her findings before the committee. If he/she passes, the probationer must undertake an oath before the Minister of Justice, the conclusion of which grants him entry to the Bar. The process requires, on average, around two-and-a-half years to satisfy the Bar Association's requirements to practice law. However, it should be mentioned that only Jordanians may petition the Bar Association to practice law.

Kazakhstan
Lawyers in Kazakhstan must complete an undergraduate law degree. The legal education system includes both law courses in secondary schools (colleges) and higher education institutions (universities, academies, institutes). After completing a degree, aspiring lawyers must then pass a special qualifying examination to enter the profession.

Lebanon
Lebanon requires a Lebanese bachelor's degree in law in order to be able to apply to one of two Bar Associations. Upon acceptance, a three-year internship is required at the office of an attorney-at-law, after which the candidate will be subject to oral and written examinations.

Lawyers in Lebanon should be Lebanese for at least 10 years.

Malaysia
Malaysia requires advocates and solicitors to be admitted to the Malaysian Bar. The prerequisite is either a Bachelor of Laws (Hons) degree (an LL.B (Hons)., which requires four years of study) from the local law faculties or a call as a Barrister in the UK or a Certificate in Legal Practice, which is a post-graduate qualification on procedural law equivalent to a master's degree and taking approximately nine months to complete, and a nine-month pupillage. Advocates and Solicitors are entitled to appear before the courts and/or perform solicitors' work, as the legal profession in Malaysia is fused without any distinction between barristers and solicitors.

The East Malaysian states of Sabah and Sarawak have their own sets of criteria for admission to their own respective law societies.

Nepal
Nepal requires lawyers to complete a bachelor's degree in law and then pass an exam conducted by the Nepal Bar Council to obtain a legal practitioner's license.

Pakistan
Lawyers in Pakistan are called Advocates.
To enjoy rights of audience in the Courts in Pakistan, a prospective lawyer/advocate must obtain a 5-year B.A. LL.B. degree or a Bachelor's or equivalent degree followed by a LL.B. of three years. The latter route is no longer offered and no admission at a Pakistani university on or after January 1, 2019, shall be recognized by the Pakistan Bar Council or a Provincial Bar Council for admission to the bar. The degree has to be obtained from a recognized Pakistani university or from a recognized university in a common law country. All legal education in Pakistan is taught in the English language. After the required academic qualifications a prospective lawyer/advocate must undertake six months training under a senior lawyer (High Courts Lawyer) (called Pupillage/ Apprenticeship/ Intern-ship /Training) at the conclusion of which, they have to take a Bar exam consisting of multiple choice question paper (or in some cases a professional exam) and an interview with a committee of lawyers presided by Judge of concerned High Court. After that the respective Provincial Bar Council may grant him or her the rights of audience in the lower courts (i.e. courts lower than the High Court).

An advocate enrolled with Provincial Bar Council can practice only in his province. He /she will earn right of audience in the High Courts after a further two years of practice in lower courts, at the end of which (in some Provincial Bar Council's) the advocate has to sit another professional exam and an interview with a judge of a High Court.

After a further 10 years' practice in the High Courts, the candidate has to sit another professional exam and an interview with a judge of the Supreme Court to be given the rights of audience in the Supreme Court of Pakistan.

The exams are usually conducted to ensure that the quality of lawyers being produced is maintained to a certain level. The interview is then another opportunity for a senior judge and members of the provincial Bar Council to meet the candidate and see if he or she is fit to be admitted as an advocate of the lower courts/ High Courts or the Supreme Court.

Philippines
To practice law in the Philippines, one must have fulfilled the non-academic and academic requirements.
For non-academic requirements, one must be a Filipino, be at least 21 years old, be a resident of the Philippines, and have the moral and other non-academic qualifications needed.
In terms of academic requirements, one must have obtained an undergraduate degree (with major, focus or concentration in any of the subjects of history, economics, political science, logic, English or Spanish), has obtained a Juris Doctor degree (or Bachelor of Laws before 2019) from a law school recognized by the Secretary of Education. 
They must have also taken and passed (75% general average, with no subject falling below 50%) the Bar Exam, taken the Attorney's Oath before the Supreme Court, signed the Roll of Attorneys, remain in good standing with the Integrated Bar of the Philippines, and continually participate in Mandatory Continuing Legal Education.

Saudi Arabia
The practice of law requires an applicant to hold a degree from a Sharia college, Bachelor of Law degree from a Saudi university, an equivalent of any of these degrees from abroad, or a postgraduate diploma in legal studies from the Saudi Institute of Public Administration. Three years of practical legal work experience are then required unless the applicant holds a master's degree in Sharia or law or is a graduate of a Sharia college with a postgraduate degree in law, in which case only one year of legal work experience is required. Those holding a doctorate in either of these fields are exempt from the work experience requirement entirely. Those who practice law must also be of good conduct and not have been subject to a Hudud or any other punishment which impugns integrity for the past five years, and must be residents of Saudi Arabia. To be allowed to practice law, applicants must fulfill the educational and work requirements, then sign a declaration confirming that they were not subjected to a Hudud or any other criminal penalty impugning their integrity within the past five years and are residents of the country.

Singapore
Persons seeking admission to the Singapore Bar must obtain an approved law degree through completing a course of study of at least three academic years leading to that degree as a full-time internal candidate from an approved university. The degree is typically an LL.B. or an LL.B. (honours), depending on the university, or a J.D. (from a Singaporean university or one of only four approved US universities). They are then required to sit for the Singapore Bar Examinations, which is divided into Part A (for overseas graduates from approved overseas universities only) and Part B (a five-month practical course, compulsory for both local and overseas graduates). They are further required to complete a six-month Practice Training Contract before they can be called to the Bar as Advocates and Solicitors of the Supreme Court of Singapore. Advocates and Solicitors are entitled to appear before courts or perform solicitors' work, as the legal profession in Singapore is fused without any distinction between barristers and solicitors. 

Exemptions from any of these requirements may be obtained from the Ministry of Law.

South Korea

In South Korea, one can be admitted to practice law by passing the exam called 변호사시험 (officially translated as "Bar Examination") which requires prior completion of three-year law school course with the degree of Juris Doctor. This law school system is similar to system of United States. However, before year 2018, there was an nation-wide system to train lawyers for 2 years, including judge, prosecutor and attorney at law. This old training institution was called as 사법연수원 (officially translated as "Judicial Research and Training Institute", JRTI)', which is now acting mainly as institution to train junior judges and court officials in South Korea. Entering JRTI required passing a special exam on jurisprudence. Its name was 사법시험 (officially translated as "Judicial Examination") which required taking a little part of course in LL.B. or any other equivalent degree.

Sri Lanka
Sri Lanka requires an attorney to be admitted and enrolled as an Attorney-at-Law of the Supreme Court of Sri Lanka to practice law. In order to become an attorney, candidates must graduate from the Sri Lanka Law College, which typically takes three years and involves three examinations. For those who possess a law degree from a foreign university recognized by the Council of Legal Education, the entrance exam may be waived. Candidates who have a bachelor's degree in law from the University of Colombo, Open University of Sri Lanka, University of Jaffna, and University of Peradeniya are exempt from all lectures and only need to take the final examination. Those qualified as a barrister in England and Wales, Scotland, and Ireland are exempt from most lectures. After graduation, candidates must then go through a practical training course and a six-month apprenticeship under an attorney of at least eight years before applying for membership in the Bar Association of Sri Lanka.

Taiwan
Taiwan requires an undergraduate law degree, which takes four years. Afterwards, students must pass the Attorney Qualification Examination. Graduates must then complete a six-month internship with certified institutions before receiving a license to practice law from the Ministry of Justice. Attorneys must join a bar association before being allowed to practice law.

Thailand
Under the Thailand Lawyers Act B.E. 2528 (1985), litigators (barristers) who practice before the courts in Thailand must obtain a "Lawyer's License" issued by the Lawyers Council of Thailand. Legal counsels (solicitors) who do not practice before the courts are not regulated and therefore are not subject to regulatory oversight of the Lawyers Council of Thailand. Law graduates who perform corporate and commercial legal services either in law firms or in-house are not required to obtain a Lawyer's License nor are they required to register with any regulatory body.

To obtain a Lawyer's License, with the right to appear in court, an individual must have the following qualifications: (i) be a Thai national; (ii) be at least 20 years of age; (iii) be a graduate with either a bachelor's degree or an associate degree in Law or an equivalent Certificate in Law from an educational institution accredited by the Lawyers' Council of Thailand; (iv) not be a person of indecent behavior or delinquent morals or a person whose conduct is indicative of dishonesty; (v) not have been imprisoned by a final judgment; (vi) not have been bankrupt by a final judgment; (vii) not having an ailment which is contagious and repugnant to the public; (viii) not being physically disabled or mentally infirmed which may cause professional incompetence; (ix) not be a government official or a local government official with permanent salary and position; (x) take a training course offered by the Lawyers Council of Thailand (normally one month of theoretical training and at least six months of practical training); (xi) pass the Thai Law Society examinations (Sapa Tanai Kwam); (xii) enroll with the Thai Bar Association (Regulation of Lawyers Council on Lawyer's Training B.E. 2529 (AD 1986)). Candidates who have been an apprentice in a law firm for over a year and have passed an examination specified by the Board of Governors of the Lawyers Council of Thailand may be exempted from the period of practical training. The lawyer's licence is valid for two years but can be valid for lifetime for a fee (s.39 of the Thailand Lawyers Act). Lawyers who wish to obtain the title barrister-at-law which entitle the holder to take further examinations to become a judge or a public prosecutor, may take a further one- year course offered by the Thai Bar Association

United Arab Emirates
A local lawyer must be registered on the Roll of Practicing Advocates, which requires the candidate to be a UAE national, at least 21 years old, have full civil capacity, have good character and reputation, not have been subjected to criminal or disciplinary actions arising from a breach of honor or trust, have a degree in law or Islamic law from an accredited educational institution, and have carried out at least one year of continuous practical legal training. UAE lawyers are qualified to practice throughout the country but each Emirate may make it a condition that a lawyer must have an office there in order to practice law. Every Emirate maintains further requirements for local lawyers. Individual foreign nationals wishing to practice law may gain an exception to the nationality requirement if they fulfill the age, civil capacity, and character requirements, have fifteen years of experience working in the legal field, must be a resident of the UAE, and must practice through a bureau of a national lawyer registered on the Roll of Practicing Advocates. Foreign law firms may carry out legal activities in the UAE subject to the regulatory requirements of the individual Emirate where they are present.

Vietnam
Prospective lawyers must complete a Bachelor of Law degree. Vietnamese law schools typically offer 4-year law programs. After obtaining their bachelor's degree, they must complete one year of professional legal training at the Judicial Academy under the Ministry of Justice and pass an exam. After obtaining a certificate from the Judicial Academy, law graduates must undergo a one-year traineeship with a law firm or law office, and must register the traineeship with the bar association of the locality where the law firm or law office is located. After completing the traineeship, the trainee must pass a bar examination conducted by the Vietnam Bar Federation. Upon passing the bar examination, the trainee lawyer must file for an application for a certificate of legal practice from the Ministry of Justice. Upon being granted a certificate, registration to a local bar association is required. The bar association which the trainee joins will then request that the Vietnam Bar Federation issue a lawyer card, which fully qualifies the trainee to practice law.

Europe

Among European Union members, the Diplomas Directive (Directive no. 89/48/EEC) states that those who have obtained a license or diploma in one state can pursue the profession in another state. Thus, it is not difficult for a law degree in one jurisdiction to be used as a qualifying degree in another jurisdiction within the European Union.

In addition, European Union Directive 98/5/EC provides three main methods for a foreign lawyer to be integrated into the legal profession in another member state. Through the aforementioned process of 89/48/EEC, a lawyer's foreign diploma can be recognized in another member state, in addition to passing an aptitude test. Alternatively, actively practicing the law of the host state for a period of three years provides a pathway for bar admission in the host country. The three-year period can be shortened by fulfilling other requirements.

Albania
Albanian advocates should be members of the Albanian Bar Association. To be admitted to the bar, a candidate must complete a law degree, complete an internship with a practicing advocate lasting a minimum of one year and receive a positive evaluation, complete the initial training program at the School of Advocacy, and pass the Advocate's Qualifying Exam.

Andorra
In Andorra, advocates should be members of the local bar association.

Austria
In Austria, an attorney ("Rechtsanwalt" in German) must meet the following requirements:

 hold a law degree,
 complete a three-year apprenticeship in a law firm as a trainee lawyer ("Rechtsanwaltsanwärter"),
 complete a seven-month clerkship at court,
 complete the required amount of training seminars (42 sessions),
 pass the bar exam.

Furthermore, trainee lawyers may only register as attorneys after they have accumulated a total of five years of professional experience (including the apprenticeship and the clerkship).

Austrian advocates should be members of one of a local bar associations which are organised into national bar association.

Belarus
In Belarus, an advocate (barrister) must be a member of one of a local bar associations which are organised into a National Bar Association. In order to be admitted to the bar, candidates must have a university degree in law. Law students in Belarus must specialize in one of the following fields to be eligible to practice law: jurisprudence, international law, state security, customs service, economic law, and state management in law. They must also undertake additional training in one of two ways. One of them is to obtain three years of professional legal experience by employment in a court or under other organizations and persons responsible for public order. The other is to undertake six months to a year of apprenticeship in a legal office. They must then pass an exam.

Belgium
In Belgium, a prospective lawyer ("advocaat" in Dutch, "avocat"/"avocat" in French) must meet following requirements:
 
 hold a master's degree in law (which requires two years of study and the Bachelor in Law which requires three years of study) or hold a PhD in Law
 taking the pledge in a court of appeal, 
 a three-year apprenticeship (Flemish prospective lawyers have to do 15 cases of pro bono during these 3 years), 
 the CAPA (French, 'Certificat d'aptitude à la profession d'avocat') course of study,
 pass the final bar exam.

During the three-year apprenticeship the prospective lawyer is equivalent to a licensed lawyer, and can for instance issue legal opinions and directly represent clients before all courts (except for the Supreme Court).

Bulgaria
The Highest Counsil of Advocates regulates the profession of a lawyer in Bulgaria.

Croatia
All attorneys in Croatia have to be members of the Croatian Bar Association as well as members of local bar associations (mandatory membership). The membership requires completion of the one-cycle five-year master's degree, the Bar Examination in the Republic of Croatia (which can be accessed after at least 18 months of apprenticeship), and at least three years of experience in a law office or in judicial bodies (or five years of experience on legal jobs outside judiciary), the time before Bar Examination included.

Czech Republic
A person must meet the following conditions in order to be admitted to practice law in the Czech Republic:
 full capacity
 Master's degree in law acquired at a Czech law school or analogous education acquired at a foreign university, if such an education is officially acknowledged as equivalent by an international treaty, by which the Czech Republic is bound, or if a particular enactment acknowledges such a foreign education, or if it is acknowledged due to its content and extent from the point of view of knowledge and skill as sufficient for practicing law by the Advocacy Enactment
 at least three years of legal apprenticeship
 personal integrity (absence of conviction for deliberate crime)
 absence of disciplinary punishment of prohibition of law practice (if a person was already a law practitioner)
 absence of being stricken from the list of law practitioners because of personal bankruptcy
 absence of labour engagement or officiary engagement, except of engagement:
 to the Bar Association or to similar organisation in other EU state
 to a law practitioner or to a legal personality established in order to provide legal services
 to a university as a lecturer
 as a scientific worker of Academy of Sciences of the Czech Republic
 passing the bar exam
 taking the pledge

Czech advocates should be members of the Czech bar association.

Denmark
In Denmark, to use the title of advokat one must complete an LL.B. (three years of study) and an LL.M. (which awards the academic title of Candidata Juris, and requires two years of study), followed by a three-year apprenticeship, one year as an assistant lawyer, and an exam which has a moot court element.

Danish advocates should be members of the Danish bar association.

Estonia
In Estonia, anyone may call themselves a lawyer and practice law. However, the title of advocate is restricted by law to members of the Estonian Bar Association. To join the Estonian Bar Association, candidates must obtain a master's degree in law and pass the bar examination.

Finland
Until 2013, anyone could in principle practice law in Finland, not just qualified lawyers. However, after the entry into force of the Licensed Legal Counsel Act (715/2011) on January 1, 2013, only attorneys that are members of the bar association and who may use the title asianajaja, or licensed legal counsel may represent clients in court.

To become a licensed legal counsel requires the completion of a legal education consisting of a Bachelor of Laws degree (or oikeusnotaari, which usually takes three years to complete) and a Master of Laws degree (or oikeustieteen maisteri), which usually takes one to two years to complete, and a traineeship of a minimum of one year in either Courts or in law firms.

After the traineeship is completed successfully, the district court awards the title of varatuomari (VT) or those who do not do a traineeship in Court can apply to be licensed legal counsel, which is in practice the basic qualification to practice law. To be admitted to the Finnish bar association, the same legal education requirement as for licensed legal counsel applies, but the traineeship requirement is four years and one has to pass a bar exam (Asianajotutkinto, "Advocates Exam") which also requires the demonstration of practical skills. In-house counsel are not allowed to be members of the bar, but can be licensed legal counsel. Also foreign attorneys can practice in Finland as in-house counsel, without being licensed in Finland, but are not allowed to represent clients in Courts 

Graduates holding a foreign LLB degree may be able to convert to Finnish law by taking additional undergraduate (oikeusnotaari) modules worth 50+ credits while pursuing their LLM studies at a Finnish university.

France
To become a French lawyer, an "avocat" (male) or "avocate" (female), one must: 
 obtain an undergraduate degree (three years for a "licence") and complete a first year of Masters of Laws (diplôme de maîtrise en droit), so a total of 4 years of study at university
 take the exam to enter one of the CRFPA (Centres Régional de Formation à la Profession d'Avocat) where one completes an eighteen-month course and obtains an award of the requisite Certificat d'aptitude à la profession d'avocat (CAPA).

However, those with degrees from another country may become a licensed attorney with a French bar by passing an exam. Depending on one's qualifications, a non-French attorney can take the Article 97, 98, 99, or 100 exam. Each of these exams has different requirements.

French advocates should be members of one of a local bar associations which are organised into national bar association.

French "juristes" (in-house counsels) do not need to hold the Certificat d'aptitude à la profession d'avocat (CAPA).

Georgia
It is not necessary to have a license to practice law in Georgia. In order to provide legal support, advice and services to clients, one must complete an undergraduate degree in law (four years of study) and a postgraduate degree in law, which is awarded by the state examination commission and requires one year of study. However, only the members of the Georgian Bar Association (ადვოკატები) are permitted to appear in court.

Germany
In Germany, a lawyer (Rechtsanwalt) must be a member of one of a local bar associations which are organised into national bar association. Membership in the local bar association requires the candidate to have passed two state examinations, or staatsexamen, in law.

Academic stage
At present, qualifying law studies do not carry a Bachelor or Master award but are instead concluded by state examinations (in contrast to university examinations). The rationale lies in the national interest of upholding the quality and comparability of legal training.

The First State Exam (Erstes Staatsexamen or Erste juristische Prüfung) is usually taken after four-and-a-half years of undergraduate law study. A university degree (Dipl.-jur. or Magister Jur.) may be granted by the university after completion of the exam, but this depends on the individual university's practice. Some prominent universities like the Law School of the University of Heidelberg do not grant a university degree after completion of the exam.

Vocational stage
The First State Exam is followed by a two-year practical phase (Referendariat) sponsored by the local Court of Appeal (Oberlandesgericht). This is characterised by part-time studies alongside full-time work and includes work placements at various institutions, including courts of law, criminal prosecution services, in-house legal teams in the public sector and private practice law firms. Upon completion of this two-year training period, a trainee is automatically registered for the Second State Exam (Zweites Staatsexamen or Assessorprüfung).

Foreign law degrees do not generally enable the holder to enter the vocational stage of legal training in Germany. Holders of a foreign law degree must pass a Section 112a equivalent means assessment (Gleichwertigkeitsprüfung nach § 112a DRiG) before they can be admitted to a German legal traineeship.

Admission
After successful completion of the second state exam, admission to the bar is completed, and the individual may apply to be licensed to practice as a lawyer or be employed by the state as a judge or state prosecutor.

Qualified lawyers holding an admission in another country may join a German local bar association if they have practiced law for several years; this is subject to individual examination.

Greece
Greece requires that a lawyer (δικηγόρος) be a member of one of a local bar associations which are organised into national bar association. Requirements include an undergraduate law degree, which lasts at least four years, an eighteen-month apprenticeship, and the passing of the bar examination. Candidates should normally be under thirty-five years of age.

Hungary
The Hungarian Bar Association is a public body and the national organization of attorneys, which has an independent administrative apparatus and budget.

The regional bar associations are the members of the Hungarian Bar Association.
The process is similar in scope to that of the German system, in that there is a dual-bar exam and practicum process. After a first degree in law, which is usually approximately 5 years, a student must pass the first level exam. Then, the apprentice must clerk or practice within a law practice for three years. Of which, one year may be substituted with further Ph.D. studies. However, they apprentice must then pass a series of 4 oral and written exams within certain subject to officially be admitted to their districts bar and practice law.

Iceland
Icelandic Bar Association regulates the profession of a lawyer in Iceland.

Ireland
Following the English tradition, Ireland has both barristers and solicitors. To become a solicitor, one must complete an undergraduate degree or pass the Preliminary Examination. One must then pass the Final Examination, complete a two-year apprenticeship, and finish the concurrent Professional Practice Courses. To become a barrister, one must complete an undergraduate law degree (BCL, which lasts three years or LL.B. which last four years) or the Kings Inns Diploma in Legal Studies which lasts two years, obtain the Degree of Barrister-at-Law from the Honorable Society of King's Inns, and finish a one-year pupillage (known as devilling).

Italy
Italy mandates membership in an Italian bar association, which requires completion of an undergraduate law degree (Laurea in Scienze Giuridiche, three years) along with a graduate law degree (Laurea Specialistica in Giurisprudenza (a two-year program which confers the title of Dottore Magistrale in Giurisprudenza), or simply the one-cycle five-year master's degree (Laurea a ciclo unico Magistrale in Giurisprudenza)), an 18-month apprenticeship, and passing of the professional exam.

There is a National Bar Association representing the profession of avvocato at the national level in Italy. However, the structure of the Italian profession is decentralised, with the local bar associations (Consigli dell'Ordine degli Avvocati) holding most of the regulatory powers. The Consiglio Nazionale Forense deals with disciplinary policy for the profession; it is responsible for the Code of Conduct and will hear appeals from disciplinary decisions of the local bar associations.

There are more than 165 Local Bar Associations in Italy which correspond to the number of court districts in the country. Each local bar deals with the admission, supervision, training and disciplining of its members as well as maintaining the register of avvocati. All avvocati must be registered with their local bar in order to practise in Italy.

Exercise of the profession of avvocato without being duly qualified and registered with the Local Bar Association is a criminal offence under Italian Law.

Kosovo
Kosovar law distinguishes between "domestic lawyers," who must be citizens of Kosovo, and "foreign lawyers," who have an active license in a recognized jurisdiction and are admitted to practice in Kosovo under certain conditions.

Domestic lawyers must pass the bar exam. To sit for the bar exam, one must be a citizen of Kosovo, have a four-year bachelor in law or a master's in law, and complete a legal internship. The internship requirement is met after a one-year work as a trainee at the courts or a lawyer's office. Otherwise, the candidate should show two years of law-related experience with foreign or domestic organizations.

Foreign lawyers must have been licensed for at least five years in a U.S. or EU jurisdiction or in a country that permits Kosovo lawyers to practice under the same condition. They pass an abridged test administered by the Kosovo Bar and pay relatively higher fees than their domestic counterparts.

Latvia
In Latvia, anyone may call themselves a lawyer (jurist) and practice law, even without a law degree. However, advocate is a protected title and only members of the Latvian Bar Association may call themselves advocates and own an advocate's office. To be admitted into the Latvian Bar Association, one must obtain a master's degree in law and pass the bar examination.

Liechtenstein
Admission to practice as a lawyer in Liechtenstein is governed by the Rechtsanwaltsgesetz (RAG). The Liechtenstein Bar Association is responsible for all bar admissions, as of January 1, 2014. One is eligible to become a licensed lawyer (Rechtsanwalt) upon completion of a Master, Licentiate (Lizenziat), or Magister of Law degree at an Austrian or Swiss university, according to Art. 5 RAG.

Lithuania
Lithuanian advocates must be members of the Lithuanian Bar Association. Admittance to the Lithuanian Bar Association requires a law degree followed by at least five years of work experience in the legal field, including two years as an advocate's assistant. Candidates must pass the qualification exam for lawyers and the bar exam. A person who has ten years of experience working as a judge or ten years of experience working as a prosecutor outside Lithuania or holds a doctoral degree in law is exempt from the qualification exam and only needs to pass the bar exam.

Luxembourg
Lawyers must register with a bar association in Luxembourg. Admission to a bar association has character, language, citizenship requirements. Applicants must also complete an apprenticeship or aptitude test, depending on the list to which one wants to register.

Malta
Malta's legal practice is fused and legal practice is regulated by the Chamber of Advocates. Licence to practice law is granted by way of a warrant issued on completion of the Master of Advocacy (M.Adv) programme from Malta University (or a comparable international programme) and an admission exam in Maltese. Lawyers holding rights to practice in other jurisdictions can apply for an exemption from local practice prohibitions allowing them to offer services under their foreign title though permission is issued by discretion and requires three years' local legal practice and a comparable licence elsewhere.

Moldova
Moldova requires an undergraduate law degree and passage of the state examination.

The Bar Association of Moldova regulates the profession of a lawyer in Moldova.

Monaco
In Monaco, advocates should be members of the local bar association.

Montenegro
Montenegro Bar Association regulates the profession of a lawyer in Montenegro.

Netherlands
In the Netherlands, to be a licensed lawyer (Advocaat), one must complete an undergraduate law degree (Bacheloropleiding or LL.B., which is three years of study), the master of law degree (doctorandus in law before implementation of the Bologna Process and conferring the meester title, which is a one-year LL.M. program), and a three-year apprenticeship.

Only holders of a law degree with civiel effect (i.e. a qualifying law degree) are admitted to regulated legal professions (juridische togaberoepen). Qualifying law degrees in the Netherlands must cover the four foundations of legal knowledge: Dutch private law, Dutch criminal law, Dutch constitutional law and international/European law.

Dutch advocates should be members of the Netherlands bar association.

North Macedonia
In North Macedonia, advocates should be members of the local bar association.

Norway
Lawyers (advokat) have to be licensed in Norway. To become licensed by the authorities, one must provided an LL.M (master of law)(before 2008- cand. jur.-- candidatus juris) and two years' practice as assisting lawyer (advokatfullmektig), two years' practice as a police prosecutor (politiadvokat or politifullmektig) or deputy judge (dommerfullmektig) and some minor formalities. In addition, one must pass the permanent lawyer's bar exam in order to obtain full access to the profession.

Whilst the earlier cand. juris was normally a 6-year degree, the LL.M. is a 5-year degree.
Membership of the bar association is optional.

Poland
In Poland, a lawyer (adwokat or radca prawny) must complete a magister's degree in law (which lasts five years) and be admitted to the Polish Bar Council. There are several ways to gain admission to the bar, including: three years of training followed by the bar exam; five years of legal professional experience followed by the bar exam; a Ph.D. in law followed by either the bar exam or 3 years of legal professional experience; or possession of high academic qualifications in legal sciences (e.g., habilitated doctor or professor). Once admitted to the bar association of one occupation, a lawyer can move to another occupation with little hassle.

Portugal
In order to register as a lawyer (advogado) in Portugal with the Bar Association, one must have a law degree, complete an 18-month legal traineeship, and pass the bar exam.

Romania
The Romanian National Union of Bar Associations regulates the profession of a lawyer (avocat) in Romania. A graduate of a Romanian law school with a bachelor's degree must pass the bar exam to obtain the status of a probationary lawyer. After practicing law under the supervision of another lawyer for two years as a trainee lawyer, one can pass the permanent lawyer's bar exam to obtain full access to the profession. Law No. 51/1995 provides paths for lawyers already educated or admitted in another EU member state to work as lawyers in Romania.

Russia
It is not necessary to have a license to practice law in Russia as a legal consultant, but only the members of the advocate's chambers (Russian bar associations) are permitted to appear in court on criminal matters (other person can be a defence counsel in criminal proceeding along with an advocate but not in lieu him) and to practice before Constitutional Court (leaving aside persons having academic degree of candidate or doctor in juridical sciences who also can represent parties in constitutional proceeding).

To become an advocate a person should pass special qualification exam. To sit for the exam, one must have a higher legal education and also two years of experience in legal work after graduation or a training program in a law firm after graduation. Specialist degree in law is the most commonly awarded academic degree in Russian jurisprudence, but after Russia's accession to the Bologna process only bachelor of laws and master of laws academic degrees are available in Russian institutions of higher education.

An examination is administered by the qualifications commission of an advocate's chamber. The exam is both written and oral, but the main test is oral. The written exam takes place in the form of computer testing and includes issues of the professional conduct of advocate and advocate's professional responsibility. After successfully passing of the written exam the candidates are allowed to take the oral exam. As part of the oral exam, the candidate must demonstrate his knowledge in various bodies of law and solve some mimic a real-life legal tasks. The candidate who does not pass the qualification exam can try to pass it again after 1 year only. The qualifications commission is composed of seven advocates, two judges, two representatives of the regional legislature, and two representatives of the Ministry of Justice.

After successful passing the qualification exam a candidate should take the oath of advocate. From the moment of taking the oath, he becomes an advocate and a member of the advocate's chamber of the relevant federal subject of Russia. Advocate's chamber sends relevant information to the territorial subdivision of the Ministry of Justice of the Russian Federation, which includes the new advocate in the register of advocates of the relevant federal subject of Russia and issues to him an advocate's certificate, which is the only official document confirming the status of an advocate, on the basis of this information. The status of an advocate is granted for an indefinite period and is not limited by any age. There is only 1 advocate's chamber in each federal subject of Russia. Each advocate can be the member of only 1 advocate's chamber and can be listed in the register of advocates of the relevant federal subject of Russia only. In case of relocation to another region, the advocate ceases to be a member of the advocate's chamber and should be excluded from register of advocates at the old place of residence (advocate's certificate should be returned to the subdivision of the Ministry of Justice of the Russian Federation, which issued it), and after that he becomes a member of the advocate's chamber and is included in the register of advocates at the new place of residence (where he receive new advocate's certificate) without any exams. Each advocate can carry out his professional activity throughout Russia, regardless of membership in particular regional advocate's chamber and regardless of particular regional register where he is listed in. Advocates carry out their professional activity individually (advocate's cabinet) or as the member of advocate's juridical person (collegium of advocates, advocate's bureau). Advocate can open own cabinet after at least 3 years legal practice in collegium or bureau. An advocate, who has opened own cabinet, can not be the member of any advocate's juridical person, and an advocate, who is the member of one advocate's juridical person, can not be the member of any other advocate's juridical person. Advocate is obliged to report to advocate's chamber any changes in his membership in a collegium or a bureau and, equally, opening and closing a cabinet.

Advocate's chambers are professional associations of advocates, which are based on mandatory membership of advocates. All regional advocate's chambers are mandatory members of Federal Chamber of Advocates of Russian Federation, which is professional association at the federal level.

In Russia, foreign Advocates can advise on the legislation of their countries; they should register in the special register maintained by the Ministry of Justice of the Russian Federation to obtain the right to carry out this activity. Foreign advocate can in addition become Russian advocate. There are two possible paths for that. The first possibility is to become Russian advocate on the same basis as Russian citizens (i.e. through higher legal education in one of Russian universities, two years of experience in legal work in Russia after graduation or a training program in Russian law firm after graduation, successful passing the qualification exam). Since Russia's WTO Accession the second possibility is available: foreign advocate can just pass special qualification exam to become Russian advocate.

San Marino
Upon possession of a four-year bachelor's degree in law from the University of the Republic of San Marino or a recognized foreign university, one must pass an examination for membership into the bar association (Ordine degli avvocati e notai). Furthermore, one must possess all civil rights, reside in San Marino, and be a citizen of San Marino or an eligible country.

Serbia
Article 6 of the "Law about Lawyers" ("Zakon o advokaturi") establishes the requirements to become a lawyer in Serbia. A prospective lawyer must have a law degree from a Serbian or recognized foreign university. Then, the lawyer must practice law at least 2 years within a law firm, and pass the Serbian bar exam. Health and character requirements apply. One must also be a citizen of Serbia. However, according to Article 14 of the law, a foreign citizen admitted to practice law in his home country can also be entered on the registry of lawyers.

Serbian advocates should be members of one of a local bar associations which are organised into national bar association.

Slovakia
In Slovakia, one must first possess a master's degree in law or a foreign equivalent to become a lawyer. A training period between three and five years is also necessary. In addition to fulfilling character requirements and passing the bar exam, the applicant must take an oath. Upon fulfilling the aforementioned criteria, the applicant will be admitted to practice law by the Slovak Bar Association. Some of these requirements can be waived for a person who is a university professor in law, has passed other Slovak legal examinations, or is admitted as a lawyer in another EU country.

Slovenia
To practice law, one must be admitted to the Slovenian Bar Association, which regulates the legal profession in Slovenia. To be admitted, one must complete a master's degree in law, pass the state legal exam, and have four years of work experience in the legal field.

Spain
In Spain, a lawyer uses the title of Abogado(male) or Abogada(female), and must be a member of one of a local bar associations which are organised into national bar association. Membership requirements for all bar associations are the same. There are 3 requirements:
1. An undergraduate course in Law. (4 Years).
2. A Master's degree in "Abogacía". (3 Terms including internship).
3. Pass an Examination.

Sweden
In Sweden, there is no monopoly on the practice of law. Anyone may call themselves a legal advisor (jurist), open a legal office, and practice law regardless of training or experience. Litigants are not required to employ qualified counsel, and anyone may appear before any court representing themselves or another person. However, the title of advokat is reserved by law for members of the Swedish Bar Association, and in practice advokats act as defense counsel in the vast majority of criminal cases. The title in effect serves as a quality label for those offering legal services. Membership in the bar association requires an LL.M. degree (juristexamen, which lasts four and a half years); three years of legal work which must be in a law office (either an established firm or one's own firm), and the passing of an oral examination.

Switzerland
In Switzerland, lawyers must complete a Bachelor of Law (BLaw, which lasts 3 years), a Master of Law (MLaw, which lasts three terms), a one- to two-year traineeship (depending on the Canton), and pass the bar examination.

Turkey
In Turkey, lawyers (avukat in Turkish) must have a bachelor's degree in law from a Turkish university or pass the exams required by Turkish law faculties if they graduated from a foreign university, register to a local bar and the Turkish Bars Association, and complete one year of internship. Foreign citizens may have a degree from a Turkish faculty of law but only Turkish citizens may practice law in Turkey.

Ukraine
The Ukrainian National Bar Association regulates the legal profession in Ukraine. In order to be admitted to the bar with the title of advokat (адвокат), one must have a law degree, two years of legal experience, completed legal traineeship, and passed the bar exam. Knowledge of the Ukrainian language is obligatory.

A foreign-qualified lawyer may be listed on the United Register of Advocates of Ukraine, and hence practice law in Ukraine, if he or she applies through a regional bar association.

United Kingdom
The United Kingdom comprises three distinct legal jurisdictions:

 English law in England and Wales
 Northern Ireland law in Northern Ireland
 Scots law in Scotland

As such, admission to practice law requires different qualifications in each country of the UK.

England and Wales
In England and Wales, different qualifications are required to become a solicitor or a barrister, both of whom are lawyers, with different rights of audience in the courts. Most lawyers are solicitors, dealing directly with clients, while barristers are specialist advocates, instructed by solicitors. For both professions, one must either obtain an undergraduate law degree (LL.B., which typically lasts three years), or complete the Common Professional Examination/Graduate Diploma in Law (which lasts one year after completing an undergraduate degree). Future barristers must also complete the Bar Professional Training Course (formerly Bar Vocational Course), followed by a year of vocational training known as a pupillage and be a member of one of the four prestigious Inns of Court.

Potential solicitors are required to complete the Legal Practice Course, which lasts one year, then a two-year apprenticeship under a training contract, during which the trainee solicitor has to complete a Professional Skills Course. Chartered Legal Executives (formerly known as Fellows of CILEx) undertake a series of training courses and are required to pass qualifications relevant to the area of practice in which they intend to specialise. The first stage for the full vocational route to qualifying is called the CILEx Level 3 Professional Diploma in Law and Practice and is set at the equivalent to A-level law. The second and final qualifications are equivalent to an honours degree course - the CILEx Level 6 Diploma in Law and Practice.

Trainees will often work at the same time as studying in order to acquire practical skills. The courses can be undertaken at a college, university or through an open learning programme. The courses are open to graduates and non-graduates. Chartered Legal Executives qualify after completing their CILEX training followed by a minimum of three years' qualifying employment. Chartered Legal Executives may do a wide range of legal work although, like solicitors, they generally specialise in one area. After completing their academic training, trainee Legal Executives often occupy paralegal roles to satisfy the three-year vocational stage of qualifying as Chartered Legal Executives.

In September 2021, the Solicitors Regulation Authority introduced the Solicitor Qualifying Examination (SQE). If a potential solicitor does not qualify under the transitional agreements with the Legal Practice Course, he must follow the SQE admission requirements:

 possess a degree (in any subject)
 pass both phases of SQE assessment: SQE1 (functioning legal knowledge) and SQE2 (practical legal skills)
 complete two years of qualifying work experience
 satisfy the Solicitors Regulation Authority character requirements.

Qualified lawyers already admitted in the UK or another jurisdiction have a simplified path to admission as a solicitor in England and Wales. They do not require qualified working experience and can apply for exemptions to SQE exams.

Northern Ireland
Northern Irish barristers are members of the Bar of Northern Ireland.

The Bar of Northern Ireland and the General Council of the Bar of Northern Ireland are governed by the Constitution adopted on the 5 October 1983.

Scotland
In Scotland, a lawyer normally studies for an LL.B. in Scots law; as an undergraduate first degree this takes three years for an ordinary degree or four years as an honours degree. The LL.B. can be taken as a graduate entry degree which takes two years. The process of admission to practice law then depends on whether a lawyer wishes to become a solicitor or an advocate.

Admission to practice as a solicitor is regulated by the Law Society of Scotland, with solicitors having to study for a one-year Diploma in Professional Legal Practice and then complete a traineeship in a law firm. Solicitors have rights of audience before the sheriff courts and justice of the peace courts.

Admission to practice as an advocate, having rights of audience before the Court of Session and the High Court of Justiciary, is regulated by the Faculty of Advocates. The Faculty of Advocates exercises this authority under the Act of Sederunt (Regulation of Advocates) 2011, which delegates the responsibility from the Court of Session. An Act of Sederunt is a form of subordinate legislation passed by the Court of Session, and the powers to regulate admission to practice as an advocate is set by Section 120 of the Legal Services (Scotland) Act 2010, which states:

Prospective advocates (called devils or intrants) will complete a period of training in a solicitor's office, a period of devilling, and then must pass an assessment under the Faculty's Scheme of Assessment for Devils. The Faculty publishes detailed regulations as required by the Act of Sederunt, which lay out all of the requirements for prospective Advocates.

Oceania

Australia
In Australia, prospective lawyers must complete an undergraduate LL.B. or graduate JD or a Diploma in Law and complete the practical training requirement which is met by completing an approved practical legal training course or an apprenticeship as an articled clerk.

Admission to practice is a matter for each State. However, a person holding a practising certificate in any Australian jurisdiction is entitled to practise from time to time in another Australian jurisdiction without gaining admission in that jurisdiction.

New Zealand practitioners may apply for admission pursuant to Trans-Tasman Mutual Recognition Act 1997 (Cth).

New South Wales

A person is admitted as a legal practitioner after completing the required academic and practical training requirements. These matters are dealt with in the Legal Profession Act 2004. The applicant applies to the Legal Profession Admission Board who assesses applications (both local and foreign), and is ultimately admitted as a lawyer by the Supreme Court of New South Wales (s31 of the Legal profession Act 2004).

After admission, a person is then entitled to apply for a practising certificate from the Law Society of New South Wales (if they wish to practice as a solicitor), or the NSW Bar Association (if they wish to practice as a barrister). The practising certificate requires the payment of fees, insurance and a contribution to the fidelity fund (which compensates clients in some circumstances).

For a solicitor to work independently with unrestricted certificate, solicitor must practice with another solicitor for two years who has held unrestricted certificate for ten years. Restrictions are shown on the certificate. To practice in Federal Court a solicitor must apply to court for a certificate and for a solicitor or barrister to appear in WCC in NSW they must be accredited by WIRO.

Victoria
Under the Legal Profession Act 2004 (Vic), an individual may practise law, as a legal practitioner, in the state of Victoria if he or she has been admitted to the legal profession in any Australian jurisdiction and holds a current local or interstate practising certificate. Furthermore, the Legal Profession (Admission) Rules 2008 (Vic) replace articles of clerkship with supervised workplace training and make changes to the process of admission to practice. Under these new rules, upon completion of an approved training course and attainment of an accredited law degree, a law graduate needs to complete either a Practical Legal Training (PLT) program or Supervised Workplace Training (SWT) to be admitted to practise law in Victoria.

Fiji
Fiji requires a Bachelor of Law degree (four years of study) as well as the successful completion of either a Professional Diploma in Legal Practice from the University of the South Pacific or a Graduate Diploma in Legal Practice from the University of Fiji, or an equivalent law degree and bar admission course from abroad. Anyone admitted as a barrister or solicitor or their equivalent in a Commonwealth country may be admitted to practice law in Fiji so long as the applicant is a Commonwealth citizen, has resided in Fiji for at least three months, and has sufficient legal experience to satisfy the Chief Justice.

New Zealand

New Zealand requires an undergraduate law degree (LL.B., which lasts four years), and completion of the Professional Legal Studies Course (which lasts five months).
Australian lawyers can apply for mutual recognition if they're admitted, for admission to the courts as a lawyer in New Zealand.

See also
Bar (law)
Lawyer
Practice of law
Disbarment
Practising certificate

Notes

References 

Professional certification in law
Practice of law